This is an inclusive list of science fiction television programs whose names begin with the letter Q.

Q
Live-action
Q.E.D. (1982)
Quantum Leap (franchise):
Quantum Leap (1989–1993)
Quantum Leap (2022)
Quark (1977–1978)
Quatermass (franchise):
Quatermass (1979, UK)
Quatermass and the Pit (1958–1959, UK)
Quatermass II (1955, UK)
Quatermass Experiment, The (1953, UK)
Quatermass Experiment, The (2005, UK, 1953 Quatermass Experiment, The remake)
Questor Tapes, The (1974, film)

References

Television programs, Q